Microchrysa flaviventris is a species of soldier fly in the family Stratiomyidae.

References

Stratiomyidae
Insects described in 1824
Taxa named by Christian Rudolph Wilhelm Wiedemann
Diptera of Australasia
Diptera of Europe
Diptera of Asia